Ichneumon nyassae is a species of wasp in the genus Ichneumon. It is endemic to Tanzania.

References

Ichneumoninae
Insects described in 1967